Club Nacional is a Paraguayan professional football club based in the neighbourhood of Obrero in Asunción. Founded in 1904, the club currently plays in the Paraguayan Primera División, and holds its home games at Estadio Arsenio Erico.

Internationally, the club is referred to as Nacional Asunción, in order to distinguish itself from Uruguay's Nacional and Colombia's Atlético Nacional.

History
The club was founded on June 5, 1904, by a group of alumni of the Colegio Nacional de la Capital, one of the oldest public schools in Asunción. The club was originally named Nacional Football Club, taking the name from "Club Nacional de Football" the Uruguayan club, whose shield and three colors were taken to associate the national origin. It is also referred as related to the school the founders attended. Its first president was Víctor Paredes Gómez and white was selected as the team color because that was the color of the Nacional de la Capital School uniform. For the emblem of the club, the colors of the Paraguayan flag were chosen.

Nacional is one of the traditional teams in the Paraguayan league and they have won a total of nine championships so far. Their nickname "La Academia" (the academy) was given to them because of their excellent youth system that produced great players such as Arsenio Erico, who is considered as the best Paraguayan footballer of all time.

In 2009 Nacional won their first league title in 63 years.

In 2014, Club Nacional made history by reaching the Copa Libertadores final for the first time ever since its foundation, and by being only the second Paraguayan club to reach the final (after Olimpia).

The club began the campaign with a runner-up finish in the group stage. In the knockout stages, they defeated Argentine clubs Vélez Sarsfield and Arsenal de Sarandí. In the semi finals, they beat Uruguayan club Defensor Sporting 2-1 on aggregate to set up a final with San Lorenzo. The first leg of the final was played in Asunción and ended 1-1. However, San Lorenzo won the second leg 1-0 at Estadio Pedro Bidegain and took the title with a 2-1 aggregate victory.

Youth
One of the club's youth teams played at the 2009 Torneo di Viareggio, the 2010 Torneo di Viareggio, the 2011 Torneo di Viareggio, the 2012 Torneo di Viareggio and the 2013 Torneo di Viareggio.

Honors
Primera División (9): 1909, 1911 (undefeated), 1924, 1926, 1942, 1946, 2009 Clausura, 2011 Apertura, 2013 Apertura
División Intermedia (3): 1979, 1989, 2003

Current squad
As of 6 March 2022

Notable players
To appear in this section a player must have either:
 Been part of a national team at any time.
 Played in the first division of any other football association (outside Paraguay).
 Played in a continental and/or intercontinental competition.

2000's
  Óscar Cardozo (2004–06)
  Cristian Bogado (2005–07)
  Glacinei Martins (2005–2006, 2007–2009)
  Juan Cardozo (2008)
2010's
  Fredy Bareiro (2014)
  Julio Santa Cruz (2014–15)
  Brian Montenegro (2014)
  Ignacio Fideleff (2016–)
  Roberto Nanni (2016–)
Non-CONMEBOL players
  Christopher Cristaldo (2016)
  Zé Turbo (2019)

Managers
 Ever Hugo Almeida (1992)
 Daniel Raschle (July 1, 2008 – June 30, 2009)
 Ever Hugo Almeida (July 1, 2009 – April 15, 2010)
 Juan Manuel Battaglia (April 1, 2010 – Dec 31, 2011)
 Javier Torrente (Jan 1, 2012 – April 19, 2012)
 Gustavo Morínigo (April 16, 2012–15)
 Ricardo Dabrowski (2015)
 Daniel Raschle (2015–2016)
 Ever Hugo Almeida (2016–)

References

External links

Club Nacional de Paraguay Official Site
Club Nacional de Paraguay Unofficial Site

 
Football clubs in Paraguay
Football clubs in Asunción
Association football clubs established in 1904
1904 establishments in Paraguay